Howard Thomas Fowles (24 January 1894 – 17 May 1973) was an Australian politician. He was a member of the New South Wales Legislative Assembly  from  1941 until 1968 and a member of the Labor Party (ALP) . He was the acting Speaker of the New South Wales Legislative Assembly for 3 months in 1962.

Fowles was born in Merrylands, New South Wales. He was the son of a blacksmith,  was  educated to elementary level at state schools. From the age of 14 he worked as a linesman for the New South Wales Government Railways and was  an official in the Electrical Trades Union until 1941. In later life, he was also a poultry farmer. Fowles was elected to the New South Wales Parliament as the Labor member for the  seat of Illawarra at the 1941 state election.   . The sitting Labor member Billy Davies successfully contested the new seat of Wollongong-Kembla at that election.  He retained the seat for the next 8 elections and retired at the 1968 state election.

References

1894 births
1973 deaths
Members of the New South Wales Legislative Assembly
Australian Labor Party members of the Parliament of New South Wales
20th-century Australian politicians